Chris Williams (born December 19, 1968) is an American-Canadian animator, film director, screenwriter and voice actor who directed the short film Glago's Guest; co-directed Bolt, which was nominated for the Oscar for Best Animated Feature; Big Hero 6, which won the Oscar for Best Animated Feature; Moana, which was nominated for two Oscars for Best Animated Feature and Best Original Song; and The Sea Beast.

Early life
Williams was born on December 19, 1968, in Missouri and spent the first 25 years of his life in Kitchener, Ontario, Canada, where his father was the director of Counselling Services at the University of Waterloo. Williams graduated from the University of Waterloo with a degree in Fine Arts and then enrolled in the animation program at Sheridan College, Oakville, Ontario. Upon graduation from Sheridan, he was recruited by Disney and moved to Los Angeles.

Career
Williams previously worked in the story department for Mulan (1998), The Emperor's New Groove (2000) and Frozen (2013), in which he also voiced the character Oaken. In February 2007, it was announced he would direct American Dog, which was re-titled Bolt (2008) and was later joined by Byron Howard, both of them replaced Chris Sanders who was the original director.

In July 2010, it was reported by various sources that Williams would direct King of the Elves based on the story by Philip K. Dick. However, in 2012, it was revealed that Williams had joined another Walt Disney Animation film, Big Hero 6, as a co-director inspired by the Marvel Comics of the same name.

In November 2018, it was reported that Williams had left Disney and he would write and direct The Sea Beast for Netflix. The Sea Beast was released on Netflix on July 8, 2022.

Filmography

Feature films

Short films

TV specials

Other credits

See also
 List of University of Waterloo people

References

External links
 

1968 births
Living people
American animated film directors
American expatriates in Canada
American film directors
American male screenwriters
American male voice actors
Animation screenwriters
Animators from Missouri
Annie Award winners
Directors of Best Animated Feature Academy Award winners
Male actors from Missouri
People from Waterloo, Ontario
Primetime Emmy Award winners
Sheridan College animation program alumni
University of Waterloo alumni
Walt Disney Animation Studios people
Writers from Ontario